George Howe was an American politician who served in the Michigan House of Representatives immediately after adoption of the state's first constitution.

Career 

George Howe settled in what is now Bridgewater Township in Washtenaw County, Michigan in 1832. A portion of Dexter Township, Michigan, had been set aside as a new township named Hixon Township, and Howe was elected its first supervisor in April 1833. That year, Hixon was divided again, and Howe chose the name Bridgewater for the new township, after a town in Oneida County, New York, and he was again elected supervisor. He was elected as a representative from Lenawee County in the first election following adoption of Michigan's constitution, and served in 1835 and 1836.

In 1837 or 1838, Howe purchased a quarter-section of land in the village of Jefferson in Alaiedon Township, Michigan, and built a sawmill. He later sold the property and mill to Captain J. P. Cowles. Howe pushed for Jefferson to become the county seat of Ingham County, but the town of Mason won the honor.

In 1838, Howe was the president of a wildcat bank in Manchester, Michigan, which went bust and cost its depositors their money.

Notes

References 
 
 
 
 
 
 

Members of the Michigan House of Representatives
American bank presidents
People from Washtenaw County, Michigan
19th-century American politicians